The Anti-Trafficking in Persons and Anti-Smuggling of Migrants Act 2007, is a Malaysian laws which enacted to prevent and combat trafficking in persons and smuggling of migrants and to provide for matters connected therewith.

Structure
The Anti-Trafficking in Persons and Anti-Smuggling of Migrants Act 2007, in its current form (1 November 2014), consists of 6 Parts containing 67 sections and no schedule (including 1 amendment).
 Part I: Preliminary
 Part II: Council for Anti-Trafficking in Persons and Anti-Smuggling of Migrants
 Part III: Trafficking in Persons Offences, Immunity, etc.
 Part IIIA: Smuggling of Migrants
 Part IV: Enforcement
 Part V: Care and Protection of Trafficked Persons
 Part VI: Miscellaneous

References

External links
 Anti-Trafficking in Persons and Anti-Smuggling of Migrants Act 2007 

2007 in Malaysian law
Malaysian federal legislation